Al Kremiah Stadium is a stadium currently under construction in Tripoli, Libya. It is to become a venue for the 2017 Africa Cup of Nations.

Football venues in Libya
Athletics (track and field) venues in Libya
Sports venues in Libya
Multi-purpose stadiums in Libya
Stadiums under construction